Chart.js is a free, open-source JavaScript library for data visualization, which supports eight chart types: bar, line, area, pie (doughnut), bubble, radar, polar, and scatter. Created by London-based web developer Nick Downie in 2013, now it is maintained by the community and is the second most popular JavaScript charting library on GitHub by the number of stars after D3.js, considered significantly easier to use though less customizable than the latter. Chart.js renders in HTML5 canvas and is widely covered as one of the best data visualization libraries. It is available under the MIT license.

See also 

 JavaScript framework
 JavaScript library

References

External links 
 

Data visualization software
JavaScript libraries
JavaScript visualization toolkits
JavaScript
Visualization API
Charts
Infographics
Free software programmed in JavaScript
Software using the MIT license
Free data analysis software